The Bamboo Incident or Hoa-Binh is a 1970 French film directed by Raoul Coutard and based on a novel La colonne de cendres by Françoise Lorrain.

Plot
About the small Vietnamese kids growed up during the horrors and hardships of the Vietnam War era. Their father with the Vietcong and their mother in the hospital, two Vietnamese children try to survive on the streets of Saigon.

Production
Filming took place about 1969 in Saigon and Bien Hoa.

Crew

 Production companies : Madeleine Films, Parc Film, Les Productions de la Guéville, C.A.P.A.C., Thiên Nga Films
 Production manager : Jacques Garcia
 Assistant director : Pierre Roubaud, Nguyễn Văn Nhân
 Sound mixer : Michel Laurent
 Composer : Billy Ellis (Fire night), Michel Portal (Le rideau rouge)
 Script supervisor : Monique Herran

Cast

 Lê Quỳnh as Nam - Papa (secret name Trí)
 Xuân Hà as Cao Thị Thu - Mama
 Michel Laurent as Hùng - Son
 Huỳnh Cazenas as Xuân - Hùng's younger sister
 Marcel Lan Phương as Mrs. Năm - A cousin
 Bùi Thị Thanh as Trần Thị Hà - Xuân's foster mother
 Kiều Hạnh as Mrs. Ngoan - Vietnamese nurse
 Danièle Delorme as French nurse
 Phi Lân as VNACC commander
 Trần Văn Lịch as Vietcong political commissioner
 Anh Tuấn as Vietcong secret officer
 Võ Đình Phương as Bụi đời's male tycoon
 Minh Ngọc as Bụi đời's female tycoon
 Raoul Coutard as Angry French man

Reception
The film was nominated for the Academy Award for Best Foreign Language Film. It was also entered into the 1970 Cannes Film Festival, where Coutard won the prize for Best First Work.
 List of submissions to the 43rd Academy Awards for Best Foreign Language Film
 List of French submissions for the Academy Award for Best Foreign Language Film

See also
 The Faceless Lover
 From Saigon to Dien Bien Phu
 Indochine

References

1970 films
1970s French-language films
Warner Bros. films
French drama films
Vietnamese drama films
Vietnam War films
Films directed by Raoul Coutard
Films based on books
1970s French films